Aruáshi, or Aruá, is a nearly extinct Tupian language of the states of Rondônia and Mato Grosso, in the Amazon region of Brazil. There were 131 Aruá in 2012 and about 20 people who speak Aruá as a maternal language.

References

Tupian languages
Endangered Tupian languages
Mamoré–Guaporé linguistic area